Chorus giganteus is a species of sea snail in the family Muricidae. It is a benthic predator that lives on rocks in temperate waters. It has been overexploited by local fishermen in much of its range.

See also
List of marine molluscs of Chile

References

External links 
  List of Chilean molluscs

Ocenebrinae
Molluscs of Chile
Endemic fauna of Chile
Gastropods described in 1831